Kevin Wasden is a science fiction and fantasy artist, illustrator, and comics artist from Utah. He has illustrated book covers, magazines, and gaming manuals. He attended Utah State University in Logan, Utah where he studied psychology before switching to art and illustration. His first major illustration job was for a professor at USU, after which he moved to New York City, where he illustrated several books and studied oil painting.

Wasden has been inspired by many artists, including Alfons Mucha, Brom, Gustav Klimt, Edgar Degas, and his favorite fantasy artist is John William Waterhouse. Wasden provided guest art for the third Schlock Mercenary collection. He is a member of the Church of Jesus Christ of Latter-day Saints.

Works
In addition to his freelance illustration work, Wasden is the creator and writer of the Technosaurs web comic.

Little Women
Wasden illustrated several books by Charlotte Emerson based on Little Women by Louisa May Alcott.
Amy's True Prize, Avon Books,  (hardcover),  (paperback)
Beth's Snow Dancer, Avon Books,  (hardcover),  (paperback)
Jo's Troubled Heart, Avon Books,  (hardcover),  (paperback)
Meg's Dearest Wish, Avon Books,  (hardcover),  (paperback)

Roleplaying books
Wasden has illustrated several roleplaying game reference manuals.
Alchemy & Herbalists, by Steven Schend, Bastion Press, 2002-03-01, 
Oathbound: Domains of the Forge, by Greg Dent, Jim Butler, Todd Morasch, Bastion Press, 2002-09-01, 
Spells & Magic, by Joe Crow et al., Bastion Press, 2002-05-13,

Other works
All the Dirt on Dinosaurs, by Don Lessem, Tor Kids,  (hardcover),  (paperback)
Ask Me Anything About Dinosaurs, by Louis Phillips, Avon Books, 
Ask Me Anything About Monsters, by Louis Phillips, Avon Books, 
Exploring Terrific Opportunities for Young Scientists: A Handbook for Teachers and Mentors of Young Scientists, by Prent Klag, Utah State University
Grave Experiences: An Interdisciplinary Guide to Cemetery Studies, by Prent Klag, Utah State University

References

External links
The Art of Kevin Wasden
Kevin Wasden Gallery
Splintered-Mind
Technosaurs

American comics artists
American illustrators
American Latter Day Saints
Artists from Utah
Fantasy artists
Living people
Place of birth missing (living people)
Role-playing game artists
Utah State University alumni
Year of birth missing (living people)